The name Juliette has been used for seven tropical cyclones in the eastern Pacific Ocean.
 Tropical Storm Juliette (1983)
 Tropical Storm Juliette (1989)
 Hurricane Juliette (1995)
 Hurricane Juliette (2001)
 Tropical Storm Juliette (2007)
 Tropical Storm Juliette (2013)
 Hurricane Juliette (2019)
Juliette has also been used on an European Windstorm

 Storm Juliette

Pacific hurricane set index articles